Capsella is a mollusc genus in the family Donacidae, the bean clams or wedge shells.

Donacidae
Bivalve genera